"Tanto" is a song recorded by the Spanish singer-songwriter Pablo Alborán. The single served as the first single from his second studio album Tanto (2012). It was released on 9 September 2012 as a digital download in Spain. The single peaked at number 2 on the Spanish Singles Chart.

Alborán put a fans' version of this music on his VEVO channel on YouTube before releasing the music video. In the fans' version he invited eight of his fans from Spain to sing this music while he's playing guitar next to them.

Track listing

Chart performance

Release history

References

2012 singles
Pablo Alborán songs
2012 songs
EMI Records singles
Songs written by Pablo Alborán